The Reform Research Trust is a think tank which publishes its own research and also publishes papers from external authors. It was founded by Nick Herbert (later a Conservative MP) and Andrew Haldenby.

The trust is a private limited company with charitable status. The name "The Reform Research Trust" was first registered with companies house on 4 March 2004 and as a charity on 13 May 2004.

The trust is funded by large donations from businesses and smaller donations from individuals.

Reform has been given a C grade for funding transparency by Who Funds You?.

Reform research trust publishes reports on a variety of different issues, adopting what it considers to be an evidence-based approach to public policy.

It has published reports on health and education reform, Britain's regional economic performance, the economic position of young people, and on the tax and welfare system.

People
Previous deputy directors include Liz Truss, and Nick Seddon, appointed as a Senior Policy Advisor for Health and Social Care to Number 10 Downing Street.

Advisory board 
 Rt Hon Baroness Morgan of Cotes, former Secretary of State
 Björn Savén, Chairman, IK Investment Partners Ltd.
Dame Clare Moriarty, Former Permanent Secretary, Department for Exiting the European Union
Dame Meg Hillier, Member of Parliament for Hackney South and Shoreditch
Deborah Cadman, Chief Executive, West Midlands Combined Authority
Robert Nisbet, Former Senior Political Correspondent, Sky News
Katie Perrior, Former Director of Communications, No. 10 Downing St.
Rt Hon Caroline Flint, former Labour MP and Minister
Sir Peter Gershon, former senior civil servant

Trustees 

James Palmer, Chair
Catherine Davies, Managing Partner, Monticle
Dr Lara Stoimenova, Managing Partner, Sigma Economics
Jeremy Sillem, Managing Partner and Co-Founder of Spencer House Partners

Speakers at the trusts events have included:
Rt Hon Andy Burnham MP and Rt Hon Sadiq Khan MP (Labour);
Rt Hon Theresa May MP and Rt Hon Jeremy Hunt MP (Conservative);
Rt Hon Danny Alexander MP and Norman Lamb MP (Liberal Democrat).

Name of trust
The Trust was originally named "The Reform Research Trust" however it sometimes refers to itself as the abbreviated "Reform" such as the website www.reform.uk which has led to some disputes regarding the name.

In November 2020 the trust voiced its opposition to the electoral committee when the Brexit Party, a British political party, intended to change its name to Reform UK. The charity feared that its non-partisan status would be brought into disrepute by the name change, and requested for the party to come up with an alternative. In January 2021, the Electoral Commission approved of the Brexit Party's name change to Reform UK.

Funding 
In November 2022, the funding transparency website Who Funds You? gave Reform a B grade (rating goes from A to E).

References

External links
Reform

Political and economic think tanks based in the United Kingdom
Organizations established in 2001
Private companies limited by guarantee of the United Kingdom